SV Neulengbach is an Austrian association football club from Neulengbach. The club was founded in 1923, and in 1996 expanded to include a women's football section.

While the men always played in the lower leagues of Austria, the women are a success story. In 1996–97, their first season, they started in the second division and won it. They were then promoted to the ÖFB-Frauenliga, the first division.

In the first season in the Frauenliga they finished 5th out of eight and reached the ÖFB Ladies Cup final. The next seasons they took 2nd, 3rd, 2nd and 2nd.

In 2002–03 they won their first championship title, without losing a game and 120–5 goals, and became a dominating force winning every championship and cup until 2012. In 2004 they achieved a record 12–0 win against FC Südburgenland in the cup-final.

In the 2009–10 Champions League, they reached the round of 16 but lost to Torres Calcio. In 2013–14 the club reached the quarter-final for the first time, losing 8–1 on aggregate to Tyresö FF of Sweden.

Much of SV Neulengbach's success was predicated on the prolific goal-scoring of strikers Nina Burger and Maria Gstöttner. The club also imported Brazil women's national football team players such as Rosana, Monica Hickmann Alves and Darlene de Souza.

Titles 
 12 times League champion: 2003 to 2014
 10 times Cup winner: 2003 to 2012

UEFA Competitions history

Current squad
Updated 13 September 2022.

Former players

References

External links
Club's website
Club at UEFA.com

 
Women's football clubs in Austria
1923 establishments in Austria
Football clubs in Austria